Melanophryniscus tumifrons is a species of toad in the family Bufonidae. It is endemic to Brazil. Its natural habitats are subtropical or tropical moist lowland forests, moist savanna, subtropical or tropical seasonally wet or flooded lowland grassland, intermittent freshwater marshes, pastureland, and heavily degraded former forest. It is threatened by habitat loss.

References

tumifrons
Endemic fauna of Brazil
Amphibians described in 1905
Taxonomy articles created by Polbot